Palupera is a village in Elva Parish, Valga County in southeastern Estonia. Palupera has a population of 198 (as of 1 January 2011).

Politician Mai Treial (born 1952) was born in Palupera.

Gallery

References

Villages in Valga County
Kreis Dorpat